Whitechurch is a village located in County Cork, Ireland, about 11 km north of Cork City. Whitechurch is part of the Cork North-Central (Dáil constituency).

References

Towns and villages in County Cork